We All Need a Reason to Believe is the second studio album by American pop punk band Valencia. It was produced by Ariel Rechtshaid, who has done projects for We Are Scientists and Plain White T's. An early review from AbsolutePunk writer Drew Beringer stated the release proved Valencia is "a band that can breathe new life into pop-punk".

The album title comes from lyrics in the second track, "Holiday".

Release
In early April 2008, the band appeared at the Bamboozle Left festival. On April 8, the band posted a rough mix of "Holiday" online. It was mentioned that the track would feature on the band's next album, which was planned for release in late summer/early fall. On June 14, 2008, We All Need a Reason to Believe was announced for release in two months' time; alongside this, the track listing was posted online. In June and July 2008, the band appeared on the Warped Tour and supported All Time Low on their headlining US tour. We All Need a Reason to Believe was made available for streaming on August 19 through the band's Myspace profile, before being released on August 26 through major label Columbia Records. The band toured the US with Sing It Loud in August and September 2008. In October and November, the band supported Bayside on their headlining US tour. On November 21, the band released a music video for "Where Did You Go?". In January and February 2009, the band went on a headlining tour of the US with support from Houston Calls. In February and March, the band toured Australia as part of the Soundwave festival. On April 30, a music video was released for "The Good Life". The band appeared at The Bamboozle festival in early May. Between late June and late August, the band performed on the Warped Tour.

Track listing
 "Better Be Prepared" — 3:09
 "Holiday" — 2:58
 "Where Did You Go?" (featuring Rachel Minton of Zolof the Rock & Roll Destroyer) — 3:21
 "Head in Hands" — 2:56
 "Carry On" — 3:41
 "All at Once" — 3:27
 "Safe to Say" — 3:21
 "Listen Up" (featuring Kenny Vasoli of The Starting Line) — 3:39  
 "I Can't See Myself" — 3:39
 "The Good Life" — 4:02
 "Free" — 4:18

Bonus track
 "Running Away" – 3:30

We All Need a Reason to B-Side
 "When Words Fail, This Music Speaks" — 2:41
 "Working" — 2:32
 "Running Away" — 3:33
 "A Better Place to Land" — 3:26

Personnel
 Shane Henderson — vocals
 JD Perry — guitar
 Maxim Soria — drums
 George Ciukurescu — bass
 Brendan Walter — guitar
 Kenny Vasoli (The Starting Line) — guest vocals on "Listen Up"
 Rachel Minton (Zolof the Rock & Roll Destroyer) — guest vocals on "Where Did You Go?"
 Dana Nielsen — engineer

References

2008 albums
Valencia (band) albums
Columbia Records albums